James Scott, Earl of Dalkeith, KT (23 May 1674 – 14 March 1705) was a Scottish nobleman and politician. He was the son of James Scott, 1st Duke of Monmouth, and Anne Scott, 1st Duchess of Buccleuch. He was also the grandson of Charles II of England, Scotland and Ireland. On 2 January 1693/94 he married Lady Henrietta Hyde (born in Hindon, Wiltshire, c. 1677, died 30 May 1730), daughter of Laurence Hyde, 1st Earl of Rochester, and Henrietta Hyde, Countess of Rochester. They had six children:

 Francis Scott, 2nd Duke of Buccleuch (11 January 1695 – 22 May 1751) married (1) Lady Jane Douglas (2) Alice Powell
 Anne (1 April 1696 – 11 October 1714)
 Charlotte (30 April 1697 – 22 August 1747)
 Charles (March 1700 – 4 April 1700)
 James (14 January 1702 – 26 February 1719)
 Henry (26 November 1704 – died young)

Lady Dalkeith was described as "the wittiest of women", still youthful and charming when she was well over fifty: "the many afflictions she suffered never touched her wit and good nature".

Lord Dalkeith died of apoplexy and was buried 19 March 1704/05 in the King Henry VII Chapel of Westminster Abbey

References 

  Retrieved 1 January 2009
  Retrieved 1 January 2009
 G.E. Cokayne, Vicary Gibbs, H.A. Doubleday, Geoffrey H. White, Duncan Warrand and Lord Howard de Walden _The Complete Peerage of England, Scotland, Ireland, Great Britain and the United Kingdom, Extant, Extinct or Dormant_ (1910-1959; reprint in 6 volumes, Gloucester, U.K.: Alan Sutton Publishing, 2000), volume 2, page 367
 Doyle, James William Edmund. The Official Baronage of England, Showing the Succession, Dignities, and Offices of Every Peer from 1066 to 1885, with Sixteen Hundred Illustrations. (p. 602) London: Longmans, Green, 1886. googlebooks Retrieved 16 March 2008

Heirs apparent who never acceded
James
Knights of the Thistle
1674 births
1705 deaths
James Scott, Earl of Dalkeith
Courtesy earls